Cornatzer is an unincorporated community in Davie County, North Carolina, United States.  It is located at the intersection Cornatzer Road (SR 1606/SR 1616) and Milling Road (SR 1600). The community is named after the Cornatzer family who resided in what was then Advance, NC and sold their farm to R.J. Reynolds Tobacco Company.

References

Unincorporated communities in Davie County, North Carolina
Unincorporated communities in North Carolina